Gwills is a hamlet in the parish of Colan, Cornwall, England. According to the Post Office the population at the 2011 census was included in the civil parish of Gunwalloe

References

Hamlets in Cornwall